Peter Kuhn (born April 14, 1955 in Summit, New Jersey- died June 25, 2009 in Stafford Township, New Jersey ) was an American race car driver. In 1980, he won both the USAC and SCCA Formula Super Vee championships. Late in the 1984 season he competed in the CART World Series for McCray Racing, making his debut at the Mid-Ohio Sports Car Course but was knocked out after 20 laps by a broken gearbox. A week later he failed to qualify at Sanair Super Speedway. In his next race at Michigan International Speedway he registered his best finish of 16th. His final start came at Laguna Seca Raceway but he was sidelined after 14 laps by engine overheating. He later became the executive vice president and general manager for ROBCO Racing Team and an American Le Mans Series team owner.

Born in Summit, New Jersey, he had been a resident of Chatham Township and the Basking Ridge section of Bernards Township.

After leaving the world of motor sports to focus on his family, Kuhn became a self-employed contractor. On June 25, 2009, he died of a heart attack while body surfing in Long Beach Island, New Jersey.

Honours

SCCA Super Vee (USA)
 1980

USAC Mini-Indy (USA)
 1980

Racing record

SCCA National Championship Runoffs

Formula Super Vee

Complete USAC Mini-Indy Series results

Complete CART Indy Car Series results

References

External links
Peter Kuhn at ChampCarStats.com
Obituary at Holcombe-Fischer.com

1955 births
Champ Car drivers
People from Bernards Township, New Jersey
People from Chatham Township, New Jersey
Sportspeople from Summit, New Jersey
Sportspeople from Morris County, New Jersey
SCCA Formula Super Vee drivers
Formula Super Vee Champions
2009 deaths
Racing drivers from New Jersey
SCCA National Championship Runoffs participants